The Algerian National rugby union Championship is a rugby union club competition that is played in Algeria and created in 2017. The national championship of rugby began in November 2018, it was learned by the president of the Algerian Rugby Federation (FAR), Sofiane Benhacen.

History
The FAR president, Sofiane Benhacen, announced at the end of December 2016 the launch in September 2017 of the first edition of the national rugby championship. The 20 rugby union teams that exist in Algeria would be divided into two pools, Center-West and Center-East, but it never saw the light of day.

Finally, the first Algerian championship in the history of Algerian rugby kicked off in November 2018. It ended on May 3, 2019 in Blida after a series of five regional tournaments (Algiers, Oran, Msila, Sidi Bel Abbès and Arzew) and a final tournament in Blida which won the best team. The first edition was won by Stade Oranais.

List of winners

Champions by club

References

External links
National Compétitions - FAR official website

 
Rugby union competitions in Algeria
National rugby union premier leagues
2017 establishments in Algeria
Recurring sporting events established in 2017
Rugby